Andrew Goodwin may refer to:

 Andrew Goodwin (tenor), Australian born operatic tenor
 Andrew Goodwin (chemist), Australian-born chemistry professor at Oxford University
 Andrew Goodwin (cricketer) (born 1982), English former cricketer
 Andy Goodwin (born 1963), Australian rules footballer